Eternal Basement is Michael Kohlbecker, a German trance artist.

Discography

Albums
 Nerv (Harthouse, 1995)
 Magnet (Blue Room Released, 2000)

12" Releases
 Kraft (Harthouse, 1994)
 Taking Place in You (Harthouse, 1994)
 Carpe Noctem (Harthouse, 1995)
 Mind Out (Harthouse, 1995)
 Understood/Raw (Blue Room Released, 1999)
 Vivaldi's Summer/Bach's Toccata & Fugue (Sony Music Media, 2000)

External links
 Eternal Basement at Discogs.com

German trance musicians
Living people
Year of birth missing (living people)
Place of birth missing (living people)